The La Asociación Departamental de Fútbol Aficionado  is the fourth tier of football in the Salvadoran football league system.

Teams promoted from ADFA to Tercera Division

Teams relegated from Tercera Division to ADFA 
 2016-2017: TBD and TBD
 2017-2018: C.D. Salvadoreno and ADO Municipal

Groups
 Asociaciones Departamentales de Fútbol Aficionado (ADFA) - Sonsonate: (C.D. Juventud Armeniense,  AD Metalio, Juventud Metalio,  Renacimiento F.C., A.D. Acaxual, Juventud Vendaval, C.D. América, C.D. El Sunza, AD Municipal, C.D Santos Domingo, CD Acajutla, EF UTSO, Santos FC, Balsamar FC, Nuevo General)
 Asociaciones Departamentales de Fútbol Aficionado (ADFA) - San Salvador: (Marte Soyapango, Sierra Morena, Escuela de futbol El Angel, Genios Del Balon FC, Real Antiguo Cuscatlan)
 Asociaciones Departamentales de Fútbol Aficionado (ADFA) - San Miguel: (C.D.Internacional, C.D Españas Santa Lusia, C.D UTAM, América Central, Brazil,  C.D Belén Santa Emilia, C.D La Paz, C.D Quelepence, C.D Olímpico, C.D San Jose, Real Mayorca, C.D Boston Águila, C.D Flor de Café, C.D 11 Lobos, C.D Águila, Zapriva Jr, Placita Juvenil, Obrajuelo FC, Agave F.C, C.D Alianza Juvenil)
 Asociaciones Departamentales de Fútbol Aficionado (ADFA) - Morazan: (Atletico Juvenil, Atlético San Simon, Corinto, Delicias F.C, C.D Villa San Carlos, Real Sociedad, C.D Pipil,   San Francisco Coroban)
 Asociaciones Departamentales de Fútbol Aficionado (ADFA) - Usulutan: (Once Berlines, Once Estrellas, Kubala, C.D Nvo Imperial, Atlético La Merced, C.D Peñarol)
 Asociaciones Departamentales de Fútbol Aficionado (ADFA) - La Libertad: (Jayaque, ADET Jr, Juventud Independiente, Fuerte San Isidro, Santa Rosa FC, CD La Cruz,  CD Atlético San Felipe, CD Venus)
 Asociaciones Departamentales de Fútbol Aficionado (ADFA) - San Vicente: (Antepec, Huracan)
 Asociaciones Departamentales de Fútbol Aficionado (ADFA) -  Santa Ana: (C.D El Cerron, CD Guiaja, CD Santiagueňo, Guadalupano, CD San Martin, Sporting Club,   Genius Soccer Academia)
 Asociaciones Departamentales de Fútbol Aficionado (ADFA) - La Paz: (Cangrejera FC, Atletico San Juan, Valencia FC, FC Estrella Roja, Atlético Nahualapa, Vencedor (Santa Rita), San Luis, Neo pipil, La Palma, UDEM, CD San Josecito, Monterrey JR, Atlas FC, CD Lombardia, CD San Marcos, Juventud escuintla)
 Asociaciones Departamentales de Fútbol Aficionado (ADFA) - La Unión:  (CD Pumas, Simon bolívar)
 Asociaciones Departamentales de Fútbol Aficionado (ADFA) - Ahuachapán:  (Destroyer FC Arcatao, Nueva Trinidad, CD Porteño) 
 Asociaciones Departamentales de Fútbol Aficionado (ADFA) - Cabañas:  
 Asociaciones Departamentales de Fútbol Aficionado (ADFA) - Chalatenango:  (FC Victoria, Talleres Jr, Sta Barbara H., Ases de Monte Rey, Escuela Municipal Santa Rita, CD Zeus, Leones FC, Los Ranchos, C.D. Titanes, Nueva Concepion, Futbol Santa Rosa) 
 Asociaciones Departamentales de Fútbol Aficionado (ADFA) - Cuscatlán: 

Current ADFA Champions 2021-2022

External links

Football in El Salvador